The branches of science known informally as omics are various disciplines in biology whose names end in the suffix -omics, such as genomics, proteomics, metabolomics, metagenomics, phenomics and transcriptomics. Omics aims at the collective characterization and quantification of pools of biological molecules that translate into the structure, function, and dynamics of an organism or organisms.

The related suffix -ome is used to address the objects of study of such fields, such as the genome, proteome or metabolome respectively.

Functional genomics aims at identifying the functions of as many genes as possible of a given organism. It combines
different -omics techniques such as transcriptomics and proteomics with saturated mutant collections.

Origin

The Oxford English Dictionary (OED) distinguishes three different fields of application for the -ome suffix:
in medicine, forming nouns with the sense "swelling, tumour"
in botany or zoology, forming nouns in the sense "a part of an animal or plant with a specified structure"
in cellular and molecular biology, forming nouns with the sense "all constituents considered collectively"

The -ome suffix originated as a variant of -oma, and  became productive in the last quarter of the 19th century. It originally appeared in terms like sclerome or rhizome.

The OED suggests that its third definition originated as a back-formation from mitome,  Early attestations include biome (1916) and genome (first coined as German Genom in 1920).

The association with chromosome in molecular biology is by false etymology. The word chromosome derives from the Greek stems  "colour" and  "body". While  "body" genuinely contains the   suffix, the preceding   is not a stem-forming suffix but part of the word's root.  Because genome refers to the complete genetic makeup of an organism, a neo-suffix  -ome suggested itself as referring to "wholeness" or "completion".

Bioinformaticians and molecular biologists figured amongst the first scientists to apply the "-ome" suffix widely. Early advocates included bioinformaticians in Cambridge, UK, where there were many early bioinformatics labs such as the MRC centre, Sanger centre, and EBI (European Bioinformatics Institute); for example, the MRC centre carried out the first genome and proteome projects.

Current usage 
Many "omes" beyond the original "genome" have become useful and have been widely adopted by research scientists. "Proteomics" has become well-established as a term for studying proteins at a large scale. "Omes" can provide an easy shorthand to encapsulate a field; for example, an interactomics study is clearly recognisable as relating to large-scale analyses of gene-gene, protein-protein, or protein-ligand interactions. Researchers are rapidly taking up omes and omics, as shown by the explosion of the use of these terms in PubMed since the mid 1990s.

Kinds of omics studies

Genomics 
 Genomics: Study of the genomes of organisms.
Cognitive genomics: Study of the changes in cognitive processes associated with genetic profiles.
Comparative genomics: Study of the relationship of genome structure and function across different biological species or strains.
Functional genomics: Describes gene and protein functions and interactions (often uses transcriptomics).
Metagenomics: Study of metagenomes, i.e., genetic material recovered directly from environmental samples.
Neurogenomics: Study of genetic influences on the development and function of the nervous system.
Pangenomics: Study of the entire collection of genes or genomes found within a given species.
Personal genomics: Branch of genomics concerned with the sequencing and analysis of the genome of an individual. Once the genotypes are known, the individual's genotype can be compared with the published literature to determine likelihood of trait expression and disease risk. Helps in Personalized Medicine

Epigenomics 
The epigenome is the supporting structure of the genome, including protein and RNA binders, alternative DNA structures, and chemical modifications on DNA.

 Epigenomics: Modern technologies include chromosome conformation by Hi-C, various ChIP-seq and other sequencing methods combined with proteomic fractionations, and sequencing methods that find chemical modification of cytosines, like bisulfite sequencing. 
 Nucleomics: Study of the complete set of genomic components which form "the cell nucleus as a complex, dynamic biological system, referred to as the nucleome". The 4D Nucleome Consortium officially joined the IHEC (International Human Epigenome Consortium) in 2017.

Microbiomics 
 The microbiome is defined as a characteristic microbial community occupying a reasonably well-defined habitat which has distinct physio-chemical properties. The microbiome not only refers to the microorganisms involved but also encompass their theatre of activity, which results in the formation of specific ecological niches. The microbiome, which forms a dynamic and interactive micro-ecosystem prone to change in time and scale, is integrated in macro-ecosystems including eukaryotic hosts, and here crucial for their functioning and health.

Lipidomics 
The lipidome is the entire complement of cellular lipids, including the modifications made to a particular set of lipids, produced by an organism or system.
Lipidomics: Large-scale study of pathways and networks of lipids. Mass spectrometry techniques are used.

Proteomics 
The proteome is the entire complement of proteins, including the modifications made to a particular set of proteins, produced by an organism or system. 
Proteomics: Large-scale study of proteins, particularly their structures and functions. Mass spectrometry techniques are used.
Chemoproteomics: An array of techniques used to study protein-small molecule interactions
Immunoproteomics: Study of large sets of proteins (proteomics) involved in the immune response
Nutriproteomics: Identifying the molecular targets of nutritive and non-nutritive components of the diet. Uses proteomics mass spectrometry data for protein expression studies
Proteogenomics: An emerging field of biological research at the intersection of proteomics and genomics. Proteomics data used for gene annotations.
Structural genomics: Study of the three-dimensional structure of every protein encoded by a given genome using a combination of experimental and modeling approaches.

Glycomics 
Glycomics is the comprehensive study of the glycome i.e. sugars and carbohydrates.

Foodomics 
Foodomics was defined by Alejandro Cifuentes in 2009 as “a discipline that studies the food and nutrition domains through the application and integration of advanced omics technologies to improve consumer’s well-being, health, and knowledge.”

Transcriptomics 
Transcriptome is the set of all RNA molecules, including mRNA, rRNA, tRNA, and other non-coding RNA, produced in one or a population of cells.
Transcriptomics: Study of transcriptomes, their structures and functions.

Metabolomics 
The metabolome is the ensemble of small molecule found within a biological matrix.

Metabolomics: Scientific study of chemical processes involving metabolites. It is a "systematic study of the unique chemical fingerprints that specific cellular processes leave behind", the study of their small-molecule metabolite profiles
Metabonomics: The quantitative measurement of the dynamic multiparametric metabolic response of living systems to pathophysiological stimuli or genetic modification

Nutrition, pharmacology, and toxicology 
Nutritional genomics: A science studying the relationship between human genome, nutrition and health.
Nutrigenetics studies the effect of genetic variations on the interaction between diet and health with implications to susceptible subgroups
Nutrigenomics: Study of the effects of foods and food constituents on gene expression. Studies the effect of nutrients on the genome, proteome, and metabolome
Pharmacogenomics investigates the effect of the sum of variations within the human genome on drugs;
Pharmacomicrobiomics investigates the effect of variations within the human microbiome on drugs and vice versa.
Toxicogenomics: a field of science that deals with the collection, interpretation, and storage of information about gene and protein activity within particular cell or tissue of an organism in response to toxic substances.

Culture 
Inspired by foundational questions in evolutionary biology, a Harvard team around Jean-Baptiste Michel and Erez Lieberman Aiden created the American neologism culturomics for the application of big data collection and analysis to cultural studies.

Miscellaneous 

Mitointeractome
Psychogenomics: Process of applying the powerful tools of genomics and proteomics to achieve a better understanding of the biological substrates of normal behavior and of diseases of the brain that manifest themselves as behavioral abnormalities. Applying psychogenomics to the study of drug addiction, the ultimate goal is to develop more effective treatments for these disorders as well as objective diagnostic tools, preventive measures, and eventually cures.
Stem cell genomics: Helps in stem cell biology. Aim is to establish stem cells as a leading model system for understanding human biology and disease states and ultimately to accelerate progress toward clinical translation.
Connectomics: The study of the connectome, the totality of the neural connections in the brain.
Microbiomics: The study of the genomes of the communities of microorganisms that live in a specific environmental niche.
Cellomics: The quantitative cell analysis and study using bioimaging methods and bioinformatics.
Tomomics: A combination of tomography and omics methods to understand tissue or cell biochemistry at high spatial resolution, typically using imaging mass spectrometry data.
Ethomics: The high-throughput machine measurement of animal behaviour.
Videomics (or vide-omics): A video analysis paradigm inspired by genomics principles, where a continuous image sequence (or video) can be interpreted as the capture of a single image evolving through time through mutations revealing 'a scene'.
Multiomics: Integration of different omics in a single study or analysis pipeline.

Unrelated words in -omics
The word "comic" does not use the "omics" suffix; it derives from Greek "κωμ(ο)-" (merriment) + "-ικ(ο)-" (an adjectival suffix), rather than presenting a truncation of "σωμ(ατ)-".

Similarly, the word "economy" is assembled from Greek "οικ(ο)-" (household) + "νομ(ο)-" (law or custom), and "economic(s)" from "οικ(ο)-" + "νομ(ο)-" + "-ικ(ο)-".  The suffix -omics is sometimes used to create names for schools of economics, such as Reaganomics.

See also 
Systems biology
Panomics

Notes

Further reading

External links

Omics.org Omics terms and concepts home page. Probably the first omics web page created.
 List of omics, including references/origins. Maintained by the (CHI) Cambridge Health Institute.

Scientific suffixes
Genomics
Omics